Principessina ("Little Princess") is a 1943 Italian drama film directed by Tullio Gramantieri. It is an unauthorized remake of the 1939 film The Little Princess, which was in turn based on the novel A Little Princess by Frances Hodgson Burnett.

Plot 
The Prince of Torrefranca has to leave her young daughter Anna at a boarding school while he fights in the First Italo-Ethiopian War. He also entrusts a huge amount of money to the Headmistress, so that his daughter will have everything she needs. The child is treated well until her father is reported missing in action. Anna is now forced to sleep in the attic and is treated like a scullery maid by the cruel Headmistress, who has taken all of her money. But the child doesn't loose the hope to find her father, and after many researches and adventures she finally finds him injured in an hospital with the help of a royal princess. At the sight of her darling daughter, the prince recovers.

Cast 

 Umberto Spadaro as Aldo Piscitello
 Rosanna Dal as Anna di Torrefranca
 Nerio Bernardi as Principe di Torrefranca, Anna's father
 Roberto Villa as Stefano, the riding instructor
 Vittorina Benvenuti as the Headmistress
 Edvige Elisabeth as Clara, the teacher
 Mario Siletti as Germano, brother of the Headmistress
 Rosetta D’Este as Mariannina
 Tina Lattanzi as the Princess
 Olinto Cristina as the Baron
 Oreste Fares as Battista, his Butler
 Odette Bedogni as the Boarding school mate
 Celio Bucchi as an Officer
 Alessandra Adari
 Ruggero Capodaglio
 Anna Carena

Production 
The movie was shot at the Tirrenia Studios. The working title was Bende lorde di sangue ("Bloodstained Bandages"). It was the debut of Delia Scala, here credited with her real name Odette Bedogni.

Reception 
The film was not a critical success.

Sources

External links 

 

1943 films